Mane Attraction is the fourth studio album by the glam metal band White Lion. It was released in 1991 (see 1991 in music) by Atlantic Records, and reached No. 61 on the Billboard 200 and No. 31 in the UK.

Overview
After a year of writing and recording, White Lion released Mane Attraction in the spring of 1991, and was received well by the fans. Unfortunately, the album failed to reach the top 20 like the last two albums. It received little or no airplay due to the recent Grunge explosion. The album featured the singles "Love Don't Come Easy" which peaked at number 24 on The Mainstream Rock Charts, "Lights and Thunder" a eight-minute heavy rock epic with a complex structure inspired by Led Zeppelin’s "Achilles Last Stand" and a re-recorded version of the band's debut single "Broken Heart", all of which featured music videos. The song "Out with the Boys" was released as a rare promo single. The album also contained White Lion's only instrumental song, "Blue Monday", a tribute to Stevie Ray Vaughan, who had died while the band was writing for the album.

The album's power ballads "You're All I Need" which was released as a promo single, "Till Death Do Us Part" and "Farewell to You" gained a huge amount of radio airplay in Indonesia and the Philippines. (Mike Tramp is married to Indonesian actress Ayu Azhari), "You're All I Need" also inspired Ahmad Dhani to create a song for Dewa 19 titled "Kangen".

A music video montage was released for the song "Farewell to You" which featured on the band's Video album "Escape from Brooklyn" in 1992.

Greg D'Angelo and James Lomenzo left the band soon after the album's release, citing "musical differences", but White Lion carried on with bassist Tommy "T-Bone" Caradonna and drummer Jimmy DeGrasso (Megadeth, Alice Cooper, Suicidal Tendencies, Y&T). After briefly touring in support of Mane Attraction, Tramp and Bratta decided to call it a day, their last show being held in Boston at the Channel Club in September 1991.

Track listing
All tracks written by Vito Bratta and Mike Tramp.

Personnel

Band
 Mike Tramp – lead vocals, rhythm guitar
 Vito Bratta – lead guitar, backing vocals
 James LoMenzo – bass, backing vocals
 Greg D'Angelo – drums

Touring members
 Tommy T-Bone Caradonna – bass
 Jimmy DeGrasso – drums

Production
Produced by Richie Zito
Mastered by George Marino at Sterling Sound, NYC

Charts

Album

Singles

Escape from Brooklyn

Escape from Brooklyn is a VHS/DVD video album by the American/Danish hard rock band White Lion, released in 1992. The video features all of the band's music videos to this point and also features behind the scenes footage, interviews with band members and a look at the band's most recent World tour in support of their fourth studio album Mane Attraction.

Track listing 
 "Broken Heart"
 "Wait"
 "Tell Me"
 "When the Children Cry"
 "Little Fighter"
 "Radar Love"
 "Cry for Freedom"
 "Sweet Little Lovin'" - Live
 "Love Don't Come Easy"
 "Broken Heart '91" 
 "Farewell to You"

Personnel
Mike Tramp - vocals
Vito Bratta - guitars
Tommy T-Bone Caradonna - bass guitar
Jimmy DeGrasso - drums
Additional:
James LoMenzo - bass guitar
Greg D'Angelo - drums

References

1991 albums
White Lion albums
Atlantic Records albums
Albums produced by Richie Zito